The Rwanda Standard Gauge Railway is a railway system, under development, linking the country to the neighboring countries of Tanzania and Uganda. The system is expected to link, in the future, to Rwanda's two other neighbors, Burundi and the Democratic Republic of the Congo, as part of East African Railway Master Plan. Through Uganda, the SGR will allow faster access to the Kenyan port of Mombasa, Rwanda's primary access to the oceans. With no previously existing railway network, Rwanda is developing its railway system from scratch.

Location
The railway system would consist of several major sections:
 Rusumo–Kigali Section
Construction is scheduled to begin in October 2018, and the Rusumo–Kigali section is budgeted to cost US$847 million.

 Kigali–Rubavu Section
When the SGR reaches Kigali, the governments of Rwanda and the Democratic Republic of the Congo are expected to work out the modalities for the extension of this railway system to DRCongo territory. In June 2019, the government of the Democratic Republic of the Congo indicated its willingness to participate in a feasibility study for the SGR to extend to Rubavu and Goma.

 Kigali–Bugesera Airport–Nemba Section 
The government of Rwanda has committed to extending the SGR to Bugesera International Airport, at a budgeted cost of US$85 million.

 Kagitumba–Kigali Section
When the Uganda Standard Gauge Railway is built, the Ugandan SGR is planned to connect to the Rwanda SGR at Mirama Hills/Kagitumba. From there, the line would pass through Nyagatare, Gatsibo, Gicumbi, Rwamagana, Gasabo and terminate at Masaka for cargo and Ndera for passengers.

Overview
This 1435 mm (4 ft  in) railway line is intended to ease the transfer of goods between the ports of Dar es Salaam and Mombasa, to Kigali in Rwanda and subsequently to Bujumbura in Burundi, and to Goma, in the Democratic Republic of the Congo. In conformity with its neighbors Uganda and Tanzania, Rwanda will use electricity to power its locomotives. In October 2018, The EastAfrican newspaper reported that construction would begin in December 2018.

See also
 Standard-gauge railway
 Uganda Standard Gauge Railway
 Isaka–Kigali Standard Gauge Railway
East African Railway Master Plan

References

External links
East African leaders push for quick deal on SGR As of 26 June 2018.

Standard gauge railways in Rwanda
International railway lines
Railway lines in Rwanda
Government-owned companies of Rwanda
Transport in Rwanda